Irving Smith may refer to:
 Irving Smith (cricketer), English cricketer
 Irving Smith (pilot), New Zealand flying ace of the Royal Air Force

See also
 Irv Smith (disambiguation)
 Irvin Smith, American football defensive back